The term Ice Bowl may refer to several different sporting events that are or were scheduled during cold weather:
 Ice Bowl (Alaska), a college football game held in Fairbanks, Alaska from 1948 to 1952
 Ice Bowl, nickname for the 1947 Cotton Bowl Classic, a postseason college football game between the Arkansas Razorbacks and LSU Tigers 
 Ice Bowl, nickname for the 1967 NFL Championship Game between the Dallas Cowboys and the Green Bay Packers
 Ice Bowl, the nickname for the 65th Grey Cup, the 1977 Canadian Football League Grey Cup
 Ice Bowl, the home skating rink of the Invicta Dynamos, a professional ice hockey team in Kent, England
 Ice Bowl, the nickname for the 2008 NHL Winter Classic, an outdoor hockey game played between the Buffalo Sabres and the Pittsburgh Penguins
 Ice Bowl, an annual collection of disc golf charity and awareness-raising tournaments held each winter at courses around the world

See also
 Bowl game
 Freezer Bowl
 Snow Bowl (disambiguation)